Gyula Alvics (born 12 January 1960) is a Hungarian boxer. He competed in the men's heavyweight event at the 1988 Summer Olympics.

References

External links
 

1960 births
Living people
Hungarian male boxers
Olympic boxers of Hungary
Boxers at the 1988 Summer Olympics
Sportspeople from Baranya County
Heavyweight boxers
20th-century Hungarian people